The Kawasaki KLE500 is a motorcycle produced by Kawasaki that is powered by a  parallel-twin engine. As a dual-sport motorcycle, it can be used both on roads and in light off-road conditions. The KLE500 was introduced in 1991.

Description 
The KLE500 has a sump guard which protects the oil pan during off-road use. Aerodynamic protection relies on a small windshield and depending on the height of the rider, the head and upper torso are exposed to the wind. The situation can be improved considerably with the use of windshield accessories, available as an accessory for the original Kawasaki model but also for other brands for the latest series, thanks to the interchangeability of parts with the widespread Z1000. The seat is wide enough to accommodate the driver and passenger. The bike is equipped with a large rear rack.

The instrumentation includes speedometer, odometer, tachometer, indicators for the turn signals and high beam. Does not have the a light indicating the use of the fuel reserve. For this, one can use the fuel valve manually operated to allow passage to the "reserve" position.

From the model year 2003 onwards, for all motorcycles, the low beam cannot be turned off by a switch on the handlebar and thus remain always on.

2005 

The changes in the 2005 model year stem from the need to update the KLE's anti-pollution system to the Euro 2 standard. Previous model characteristics were within the Euro 1 guidelines.

Given the need to renew the model, Kawasaki included a facelift that rejuvenated the line. In particular, it redesigned the windshield making it similar to that of Z1000 and Z750, using the same glass unit. They also changed the turn signals and the instrument panel. The earlier fairing of the disc brake was removed.

External links 
 Kawasaki Owners Club Forum

KLE500
Dual-sport motorcycles
Motorcycles introduced in 1991
Motorcycles powered by straight-twin engines